Below is a list of amphibians and reptiles of Mount Halimun Salak National Park in West Java, Indonesia, drawn from Kurniati (2005).

Amphibians
Leptobrachium hasseltii  — Java and nearby eastern islands
Megophrys montana
Leptophryne borbonica
Leptophryne cruentata  — endemic
Phrynoidis asper
Ingerophrynus biporcatus
Duttaphrynus melanostictus
Microhyla achatina  — Java and southern Sumatra
Huia masonii  — endemic
Hylarana chalconota
Hylarana erythraea
Hylarana nicobariensis
Odorrana hosii
Fejervarya cancrivora
Fejervarya limnocharis
Limnonectes kuhlii
Limnonectes macrodon
Limnonectes microdiscus  — Java and southern Sumatra
Occidozyga sumatrana
Nyctixalus margaritifer  — endemic
Philautus aurifasciatus
Philautus vittiger  — endemic
Polypedates leucomystax
Rhacophorus javanus  — endemic
Rhacophorus reinwardtii

Reptiles

Lizards
Cyrtodactylus marmoratus
Gehyra mutilata
Hemidactylus frenatus
Draco jimbriatus hennigi
Draco haematopogon
Draco volans
Bronchocela cristatella
Bronchocela jubata
Gonocephalus chamaeleontinus
Gonocephalus kuhlii
Pseudocalotes tympanistriga
Tachydromus sexlineatus
Mabuya multifasciata
Sphenomorphus puncticentralis
Sphenomorphus sanctus
Sphenomorphus temmincki

Snakes
Python reticulatus
Ahaetulla prasina
Aplopeltura boa
Calamaria lumbricoidea
Calamaria schlegelii
Dendrelaphis pictus
Liopeltis baliodeirus
Liopeltis tricolor
Psammodynastes pulverulentus
Rhabdophis chrysargos
Rhabdophis subminiatus
Xenochrophis trianguligerus
Xenodermus javanicus
Bungarus candidus
Trimeresurus puniceus

References

Kusrini MD, Lubis MI, Darmawan B. 2008. The Tree Frog of Chevron Geothermal Concession, Mount Hakimun-Salak National Park - Indonesia. Technical report submitted to the Wildlife Trust – Peka Foundation.

See also
List of amphibians of Java
List of amphibians of Sumatra

Fauna of Java
Amphibians of Indonesia
Reptiles of Indonesia